The 2016 ITU World Triathlon Series was a series of nine World Championship Triathlon events that lead up to a Grand Final held in Cozumel. The Series was organised under the auspices of the world governing body of triathlon, the International Triathlon Union (ITU).

Calendar
The 2016 series visited nine cities around the world. This figure, one lower than 2015, due to the triathlon at Rio 2016.

Results

Medal summary

Men

Women

Overall standings
The athlete who accumulates the most points throughout the 8 race season is declared the year's world champion. The final point standings are:

Men

Women

References

External links
ITU Rankings

2016
World Triathlon Series